Walter Frosch (19 December 1950 – 23 November 2013) was a German professional footballer who played as a defender.

Career
Frosch played for SV Alsenborn, 1. FC Kaiserslautern and FC St. Pauli.

References

1950 births
2013 deaths
German footballers
Association football defenders
Bundesliga players
2. Bundesliga players
SV Alsenborn players
FC St. Pauli players
1. FC Kaiserslautern players